is a passenger railway station located in the city of Narashino, Chiba Prefecture Japan, operated by the private railway company, Shin-Keisei Electric Railway. The station is 400 meters from Tsudanuma Station on the JR East Sobu Main Line.

Lines
Shin-Tsudanuma Station is served by the Shin-Keisei Line, and is located 25.3 km from the official starting point of the line at Matsudo Station.

Station layout
The station consists of two opposed side platforms connected by a footbridge..

Platforms

History
Shin-Tsudanuma Station opened on December 27, 1947, although it was originally located 300 m from the current station. From 1953-1968, a spur line was extended from Maebara Station to Shin-Tsudanuma Station via , which replaced Shin-Tsudanuma Station from 1953 until it was closed to passenger service in 1961, at which point the original Shin-Tsudanuma Station was re-opened. The line was demolished in 1968 along with Fujisakidai Station; the current station was opened the same year.

Passenger statistics
In fiscal 2018, the station was used by an average of 69,491 passengers daily (boarding passengers only).

Surrounding area
 Tsudanuma Station (Sobu Main Line)
 central Narashino city

See also
 List of railway stations in Japan

References

External links

 Shin Keisei Railway Station information 

Railway stations in Japan opened in 1947
Railway stations in Chiba Prefecture
Narashino